Stephen Samuel Wise (March 17, 1874 – April 19, 1949) was an early 20th-century American Reform rabbi and Zionist leader in the Progressive Era. Born in Budapest, he was an infant when his family immigrated to New York. He followed his father and grandfather in becoming a rabbi, serving in New York and in Portland, Oregon. Wise was also a founding member of the NAACP.

Early life 
Wise was born on March 17, 1874, in Budapest in the Austro-Hungarian Empire, the son and grandson of rabbis and their wives. His grandfather, Joseph Hirsch Weiss, was rabbi of a small town near Budapest. His father, Aaron Wise, earned a PhD and ordination in Europe. Wise's maternal grandfather, Móric Fischer de Farkasházy, created the Herend Porcelain Company. When Wise's father sought to unionize the company, Moric gave the family one-way tickets to New York. Wise was an infant when they immigrated, and his father Aaron Wise became rabbi of Congregation Baith Israel Anshei Emes in Brooklyn, New York.

His father became rabbi of Rodeph Sholom, a Manhattan Conservative congregation of wealthy German Jews.

Education 
Wise attended local public schools. He received his higher education at the College of the City of New York, Columbia College (B.A. 1892, Cum laude), and Columbia University (PhD 1902). Later he pursued rabbinical studies under rabbis Richard J. H. Gottheil, Alexander Kohut, Gersoni, Joffe, and Margolis. He was ordained as rabbi by Rabbi Adolph Jellinek of Vienna in 1893. In 1933, Wise received an honorary L.H.D. from Bates College.

Career 
In 1893, Wise was appointed assistant rabbi of Congregation B'nai Jeshurun, Manhattan; its senior rabbi was Henry S. Jacobs. Later in the same year, Wise became the senior rabbi of the same congregation.

In 1900, he was called as rabbi to Congregation Beth Israel in Portland, Oregon.  Typical of the activists of the Progressive Era, he attacked "many of the social and political ills of contemporary America." In 1906, concerning another rabbinical appointment, Wise made a major break from the established Reform movement over the "question whether the pulpit shall be free or whether the pulpit shall not be free, and, by reason of its loss of freedom, reft of its power for good"; in 1907 he established his Free Synagogue, starting the "free Synagogue" movement.

Wise was an early supporter of Zionism. His support for, and commitment to Political Zionism was atypical of Reform Judaism, which had been historically non-Zionist since it adopted the Pittsburgh Platform in 1885. He was a founder of the New York Federation of Zionist Societies in 1897, which led in the formation of the national Federation of American Zionists (FAZ), a forerunner of the Zionist Organization of America. At the Second Zionist Congress (Basel, 1898), Wise was a delegate and secretary for the English language. Wise served as honorary secretary of FAZ, in close cooperation with Theodor Herzl, until the latter's death in 1904.

In 1915, Wise was one of the founding members of the American Committee on Armenian Atrocities, which later became Near East Relief. Historian Claire Mouradian states that his activities over thirty years (from the Hamidian massacres to the creation of the Republic of Turkey) "reveal a constant concern for raising awareness in favor of the Armenians, whose fate seemed to be a premonition of what might be awaiting Jews in Europe".

Joining U.S. Supreme Court Justice Louis Brandeis, Felix Frankfurter, and others, Wise laid the groundwork for a democratically elected, nationwide organization of 'ardently Zionist' Jews, 'to represent Jews as a group and not as individuals'. In 1917 he participated in the effort to convince President Woodrow Wilson to approve the Balfour declaration in support of Jewish settlement in Mandate Palestine. In 1918, following national elections, this Jewish community convened the first American Jewish Congress in Philadelphia's historic Independence Hall.

In December 1925, Wise delivered a sermon about Jesus the Jew, causing an uproar culminating in an edict of condemnation against him by the Agudath Harabonim (Union of Orthodox Rabbis).

In 1938, as president of the American Jewish Congress, Wise said that adoption of the Alaska proposal in the Slattery Report would deliver "a wrong and hurtful impression ... that Jews are taking over some part of the country for settlement."

Friendship with Einstein
Albert Einstein found Wise's mixture of enlightened views and committed Zionism most agreeable, and they became friends when Einstein moved to the US. In a tribute to Wise on his 60th birthday, Einstein said, "Above all, what I admire in him is his bold activity toward building the self-respect of the Jewish people, combined with profound tolerance and penetrating understanding of everything human."

Views on Jerome Davis
During the trial of the sociologist Jerome Davis, Wise stated, based on more than 30 years of acquaintance, that Davis had "never, never" been sympathetic to communism.

Public and charitable offices 
In 1902 Wise officiated as first vice-president of the Oregon State Conference of Charities and Correction.  In 1903 he was appointed Commissioner of Child Labor for the State of Oregon, and founded the Peoples' Forum of Oregon. These activities initiated a lifelong commitment to social justice, stemming from his embrace of a Jewish equivalent of the Social Gospel movement in Christianity.

In A History of Jews in America historian Howard Sachar wrote, "In 1914, Professor Emeritus Joel Spingarn of Columbia University became chairman of the NAACP and recruited for its board such Jewish leaders as Jacob Schiff, Jacob Billikopf, and Rabbi Stephen Wise." 

In 1922 Wise founded the Jewish Institute of Religion, an educational center in New York City to train rabbis in Reform Judaism. It was merged into the Hebrew Union College a year after his death. In 1922 Wise was one of the founding trustees of the Palestine Endowment Funds, Inc., along with Julian Mack.

When the Federation of American Zionists (FAZ) was originally established, Wise was appointed the position secretary. After the organization transformed into the Zionist Organization of America, Rabbi Wise fulfilled positions as both president and vice president during his lifetime.

Wise was a close friend of President Franklin D. Roosevelt, who turned to Wise for advice on issues concerning the Jewish community in the United States. In addition, Wise had also acted a liaison to previous President Wilson.

At the 1924 Democratic National Convention, he was a delegate from New York; at the opening of the sixth session on June 28, 1924, he offered the invocation.  During the 1928 campaign, Wise was a prominent supporter of Democrat Al Smith.

In 1925 Wise became chairman of Keren Hayesod, while continuing efforts to bring the Reform movement around to a pro-Zionist stance. With the rise to power of Adolf Hitler's regime, Wise took the position that public opinion in the United States and elsewhere should be rallied against the Nazis. He used his influence with President Roosevelt both in this area as well as on the Zionist question.

In 1933 while acting as honorary president of the American Jewish Congress, Wise led efforts for a Jewish Boycott of Germany. He stated "The time for prudence and caution is past. We must speak up like men. How can we ask our Christian friends to lift their voices in protest against the wrongs suffered by Jews if we keep silent? What is happening in Germany today may happen tomorrow in any other land on earth unless it is challenged and rebuked. It is not the German Jews who are being attacked. It is the Jews". Urged by Wise to protest to the German government, U.S. Secretary of State Cordell Hull issued a mild statement to the American ambassador to Berlin complaining that "unfortunate incidents have indeed occurred and the whole world joins in regretting them."

Wise, along with Leo Motzkin and Nahum Goldmann, encouraged the creation in August 1936 of the World Jewish Congress in order to create a broader representative body to fight Nazism. Wise served as founding president of the World Jewish Congress president until his death in 1949. He was succeeded by his friend Nahum Goldmann.

On November 24, 1942, after being informed by U.S. Under-secretary of State Sumner Welles, Wise held a press conference in Washington, D.C. and announced that the Nazis had a plan for the extermination of all European Jews, and had already killed 2 million; it didn't make front-page news. The information was based on the Riegner Telegram, a message sent to Wise in August 1942 by Gerhart M Riegner, then representative of the World Jewish Congress in Geneva, informing the Allies about the plans of the so-called "Final Solution of the Jewish question" for the first time. Together with Nahum Goldmann, Wise spread the information about the ongoing genocide to Sweden and other countries by telegram.

Wise was an ardent opponent of plans to create a Jewish community in Suriname. In a letter to Keren Hayesod emissary Ida Silverman he wrote, "I personally believe, that Steinberg needs to be lynched or hanged and quartered, if that would make his lamented demise more certain."  Isaac Nachman Steinberg being the co-founder of the Freeland League, a territorialist organization that was leading negotiations with the Surinamese government.

During the war years, Wise was elected co-chair of the American Zionist Emergency Council, a forerunner of the American Israel Public Affairs Committee.

Works 
Wise translated The Improvement of the Moral Qualities, an ethical treatise of the eleventh century by Solomon ibn Gabirol (New York, 1902) from the original Arabic, and wrote The Beth Israel Pulpit, among other works.  He was invited to deliver the annual Charles P. Steinmetz Memorial Lecture at Union College in 1944.

Criticism 
David Kranzler criticized Wise for allegedly failing to recognize the Holocaust prior to American entry into World War II, dismissing early reports of the Final Solution as propaganda, and obstructing rescue efforts.

Historian Saul Friedländer said that Wise prevented the shipment of food packages from American Jews to German-occupied Poland for fear that the Allies would be interpreted the aid as being sent to the enemy, who writes: "In the spring of 1941 Rabbi Wise had decided to impose a complete embargo on all aid sent to Jews in occupied countries, in compliance with the U.S. government's economic boycott of the Axis powers (whereby every food package was seen as direct or indirect assistance to the enemy)... Strict orders were given to World Jewish Congress representatives in Europe to halt forthwith any shipment of packages to the ghettos, despite the fact that these packages did usually reach their destination, the Jewish Self-Help Association in Warsaw. 'All these operations with and through Poland must cease at once,' Wise cabled to Congress delegates in London and Geneva, 'and at once in English means AT ONCE, not in the future.'"

In the 2002 book A Race Against Death: Peter Bergson, America, and the Holocaust, David Wyman and Rafael Medoff argue that Wise displayed a lack of leadership which hindered the Holocaust rescue attempts of the Bergson Group and others.

Wise was also partially successful in preventing some performances, but not the national broadcast, of the all-star pageant We Will Never Die, which sought to bring attention to the plight of Jews in Europe.

Personal life 

Wise married Louise Waterman.  The couple had two children: writer James Wise (born 1901); and Judge Justine Wise Polier (1903-1987).

Wise died on April 19, 1949, in New York City, aged 75. He is interred in an unmarked mausoleum in Westchester Hills Cemetery located in Hastings-on-Hudson, New York.

The Stephen Wise Free Synagogue, which he founded in 1907 and served as Rabbi until his death, is named after him, as is Stephen S. Wise Temple in Los Angeles, which was founded by Rabbi Isaiah Zeldin in 1964. A street is named after him in Jerusalem next to the Israel Museum, and others in Haifa, Rishon LeZion and Petah Tikvah.

See also 
 American Jewish Congress
 Free Synagogue
 Jerome Davis (sociologist)
 Pittsburgh Platform
 Political Zionism
 Slattery Report

References

Further reading

External links 

 worldjewishcongress.org
 Jewish Encyclopedia article on S.S.Wise
 Stephen S. Wise (Jewish Virtual Library)
 Biography at PBS.org
 Cleveland Jewish History note on Wise
 Stephen Samuel Wise and the Jews of America by Dr. Henry Abramson
 Preliminary Guide to the Stephen S. Wise Papers, 1905–1977, Special Collections Research Center, Estelle and Melvin Gelman Library, The George Washington University
 
 
 Stephen Wise Papers at the American Jewish Historical Society, New York, NY
Stephen Wise Speaks Out for Women's Suffrage in 1915 Recording

1874 births
1949 deaths
American Reform rabbis
American activists
American Zionists
American Jewish Congress
American people of Hungarian-Jewish descent
Austro-Hungarian emigrants to the United States
Burials at Westchester Hills Cemetery
Columbia College (New York) alumni
Jewish American writers
Jewish American people in New York (state) politics
Rabbis from New York City
Reform Zionists
Writers from Budapest
20th-century American rabbis
19th-century American rabbis